Demetris Th. Gotsis was a Greek poet and author residing in Cyprus. He was born October 26, 1945 in Thessaloniki, Greece and died April 21, 2021 in Nicosia, Cyprus.
He studied Medicine at the Aristotle University of Thessaloniki and received musical education since his parents were trained opera singers.

Background
He specialized in Germany, where he worked for several years. His first collection of Poetry was published when he was already 44. Since 1986, he has been living in Paphos, Cyprus. Lyrics of Gotsis were compiled in French, English, German, Spanish and Finnish Anthologies. Also, poems of Gotsis originally written in German, have been published in anthologies in Munich and in Kiel. He was awarded the second prize for Poetry of the Republic of Cyprus in 1995 and the first prize at the International Competition for Poetry of "Griechisch Kunst - und Literatur-Verein" in Munich, Germany in 2002. He is a founding member of the Paphos' Society of Littérateurs, a member of the Cyprus' Union of Littérateurs, member of PEN Club-Cyprus and of the Association Internationale des Critiques Litéraires.

Works

Poetry
 The Yoke's  Rod (Έστωρ, Nicosia, 1989).
 Vestments (Ιμάτια, Nicosia, 1990).
 Songs of Theodore Oesten (Του Έστεν τα τραγούδια), Children's poetry for Oesten's music in Greek, Nicosia, 1991.
 ... and highland is the Garden (...και Ορεινός ο Κήπος, Nicosia, 1992).
 Yard of Easter, Songs for the Imprisoned Graves (Αυλή του Πάσχα, Άσματα για τα Φυλακισμένα Μνήματα), foreword by Takis Varvitsiotis, Nicosia, 1994). Prize for Poetry of the Republic of Cyprus, 1995.
 The Journey's Ends (Ταξιδίου Τέρματα, Nicosia, 1998).
 About the Darkness (Της Ευφρόνης, Nicosia, 2001).
 Concentric in Three Persons (Ομόκεντρον σε Τρία Πρόσωπα, Nicosia, 2003).
 Traveling with Malte (Ταξιδεύοντας με τον Μάλτε, Athens, Armos 2006).

Essays
 Essays about Dionysios Solomos, Andreas Kalvos, Konstantinos Kavafis, Giorgos Seferis, Demetris P. Papaditsas, Christos Malevitsis, Nikiphoros Vrettakos, Takis Varvitsiotis etc.

Theatre
 "Macedonian Women", Imitation of Old Greek Drama, 1991, performed in the Radio of Cyprus Broadcasting Corporation.

Translations
Ιnto Greek:

 Rainer Maria Rilke, "The Sonnets to Orpheus" -together with Andreas Petrides- (Τα Σονέττα στον Ορφέα, Nicosia, 1995) and "The Elegies of Duino", (Οι Ελεγείες του Ντουίνο, Athens, Armos , 2000).
 Friedrich Hölderlin, "Poems, large selection in three parts", (Ποιήματα, Μεγάλη Εκλογή σε Τρία Μέρη, Athens, Armos 2002).
 He has also translated other German and Austrian poets like: Johannes Bobrowski, Nelly Sachs, Peter Huchel, Joachim Ringelnatz, Sarah Kirsch, Ingeborg Bachmann, Ilse Aichinger, Georg Trakl, Stefan George.

Music
 Foreign Works for Chorus with Greek verse, (Ξένα Χορωδιακά Έργα με ελληνικό κείμενο), foreword by Antonis Kontogeorgiou, Hellenic Republic, Ministry of Culture, Centre for Choruses, editions Papagregoriou-Nakas , Athens, 1999.

External links
Μόνο στην Τρυφερότητα, περιοδικό "ΕΥΘΥΝΗ", τεύχος 342, Ιούνιος 2000
Χ. Δ. Γουνελάς, Ο αγνός Φρήντριχ στην Πάτμο - Συστηματική ματιά στο corpus ενός μεγάλου φιλέλληνα λυρικού, Το Βήμα, 29 June 2003

1945 births
Living people
Writers from Thessaloniki
Cypriot non-fiction writers
Cypriot poets
Greek essayists
Greek translators
Modern Greek poets
Writers about music
Translators from German
Translators to Greek
20th-century Greek poets
20th-century essayists